Aandavan Kattalai may refer to:
 Aandavan Kattalai (1964 film), an Indian Tamil-language film
 Aandavan Kattalai (2016 film), an Indian Tamil-language film